In mathematics and particularly in topology, pairwise Stone space is a bitopological space  which is pairwise compact, pairwise Hausdorff, and pairwise zero-dimensional.

Pairwise Stone spaces are a bitopological version of the Stone spaces.

Pairwise Stone spaces are closely related to spectral spaces.

See also

 Bitopological space
 Duality theory for distributive lattices

Notes

Topology